West Hallam White Rose Cricket Club is an amateur cricket club on the southern edge of West Hallam, Derbyshire, England. The club has a history dating back to 1880.

Ground
The home ground is located on The Statham Oval (Cock Orchard) off Cat and Fiddle Lane West Hallam and the ground is rated by the DCCL as a Grade A ground.

History
The origins of the club date to the mid 19th century. Newspaper reports have been found recording cricket matches played by "West Hallam Cricket Club" in the grounds of the Squire Hall, off Cock Orchard in 1851. By 1871, the Hall was demolished and the club had to rent land from a local farmer, whose farm stood on the junction of The Village (street) and School Square. "Hallam White Rose Cricket Club" appeared on record in 1880. The addition of the 'White Rose' is said to be based on the white rose bushes in the gardens of the old Squire Hall. It is not known when the club moved to a recreation ground on Beech Lane, but after the Second World War, the Club played on a field off St. Wilfrid's Road until 1950, when they returned to what became Powtrell Community Pavilion Court on Beech Lane. The Club won the Butterley Cup in 1962, a couple of years before joining the Notts & Derbyshire Border League in 1964 (which is now the Derbyshire County Cricket League); prior to this they mainly focused on playing friendly matches. By 2001, they became Division 1 League Champions and by 2007 they finally moved back to Cock Orchard off the Cat and Fiddle Lane, and officially opened their new home now known as The Statham Oval in 2011.

The Club currently have two senior teams competing in the Derbyshire County Cricket League, a junior training section that play competitive cricket in the Erewash Young Cricketers League and the Club are regulars in the Derbyshire Cricket Board Indoor Competition.

Club performance
The Derbyshire County Cricket League competition results showing the club's positions in the league (by Division) since 2001.

The Derbyshire Cricket Board Indoor Competition results showing the club's positions in the league (by Division) since 2014.

Club honours

The Club on film
  West Hallam White Rose Cricket Club Memories.
  Harry Porter, Ken Parish and Dick Owen discuss their cricketing memories at West Hallam WRCC.
  John Burton, Dave Cooper and Mick Brown discuss the origins of their cricket club, and much more.
  Ken Parish and Dave Cooper chat about their cricket club in this short recording.

See also
 Club cricket

Notes

References

External links
 The Club Play-Cricket website
 Derbyshire County Cricket League Official Play-Cricket website
 Derbyshire Cricket Board Indoor Competition Official Play-Cricket website
 Erewash Young Cricketers League

English club cricket teams
Cricket in Derbyshire
1880 establishments in England
Club cricket